The Clifton Public Schools is a comprehensive community public school district that serves students in pre-kindergarten through twelfth grade from Clifton, in Passaic County, New Jersey, United States.

As of the 2020–21 school year, the district, comprised of 18 schools, had an enrollment of 10,514 students and 870.5 classroom teachers (on an FTE basis), for a student–teacher ratio of 12.1:1.

The district is classified by the New Jersey Department of Education as being in District Factor Group "CD", the sixth-highest of eight groupings. District Factor Groups organize districts statewide to allow comparison by common socioeconomic characteristics of the local districts. From lowest socioeconomic status to highest, the categories are: A, B, CD, DE, FG, GH, I and J.

History
The district established a high school in 1906, with 40 students, with a curriculum that covered "English, Latin, Greek, German, history, mathematics, physics, chemistry, bookkeeping, shorthand, [and] typewriting." By 1914, the school had 150 students. A new building was dedicated in April 1926, by which time the school served an enrollment of 1,100.

The current high school building on Colfax Avenue was completed at a cost of $6 million (equivalent to $ million in ) and opened in September 1962 with 3,000 students.

An additional overflow site, the Clifton High School Annex, was constructed at a cost of $17 million (equivalent to $ million in ) and opened in September 2009 to accommodate 540 of the school year's 850 incoming freshmen to alleviate overcrowding.

Schools
Schools in the district (with 2020–21 enrollment data from the National Center for Education Statistics) are:
Preschool
Clifton Early Learner Academy (377 students; in grades PreK)
Marissa Papamarkos, Principal
Elementary schools
School One (245; K-5)
Maria Romeo, Principal
School Two (385; K-5)
Jennifer Lucas, Principal
School Three (282; K-5)
Linette Park, Principal
School Four (141; K-5)
Dr. Ronnie Estrict, Principal
School Five (373; K-5)
Stephen Anderson, Principal
School Eight (169; PreK-5)
Wendy Munoz, Principal
School Nine (285; K-5)
Joelle Rosetti, Principal
School Eleven (415; K-5)
Dalia Shalaby, Principal
School Twelve (616; PreK-5)
Rosmunda Kenning, Principal
School Thirteen (447; K-5)
Rachel Capizzi, Principal
School Fourteen (356; K-5)
Jason Habedank, Principal
School Fifteen (310; PreK-5)
Dr. Luginda Batten-Walker, Principal
School Sixteen (195; K-5)
Joanna Juarbe, Principal
School Seventeen (476; PreK-5)
Laura Zargorski, Principal
Middle schools
Christopher Columbus Middle School (1,172; 6-8)
Vanessa Gaba, Principal
Woodrow Wilson Middle School (1,276; 6-8)
Andrew Jaeger, Principal
High school
Clifton High School (2,891; 9-12)
Ahmad Hamdeh, Principal
With more than 3,300 students enrolled as of 2006, Clifton High School was the largest single-facility high school in New Jersey; Elizabeth High School had more students, but they were spread over multiple campuses before the school was split into separate academies.

Administration
Core members of the district's administration are:
Dr. Danny A. Robertozzi, Superintendent of Schools
Michael Ucci, Business Administrator / Board Secretary

Board of education
The district's board of education is comprised of nine members who set policy and oversee the fiscal and educational operation of the district through its administration. As a Type II school district, the board's trustees are elected directly by voters to serve three-year terms of office on a staggered basis, with three seats up for election each year held (since 2012) as part of the November general election. The board appoints a superintendent to oversee the district's day-to-day operations and a business administrator to supervise the business functions of the district.

References

External links
Clifton Public Schools

School Data for the Clifton Public Schools, National Center for Education Statistics

Clifton, New Jersey
New Jersey District Factor Group CD
School districts in Passaic County, New Jersey